Elm Tree Ridge is a mountain located in the Catskill Mountains of New York east of Hancock. Bittersweet Hill is located west, Rattlesnake Hill is located south, Big Fork Mountain is located east-southeast, and Johnny Ridge is located southwest of Elm Tree Ridge.

References

Mountains of Delaware County, New York
Mountains of New York (state)